Syndetic may refer one of the following

Syndetic set, in mathematics
Syndetic coordination, in linguistics